The genus Oxythyrea consists of a number of chafer beetle species. Members are typically about 10–15 mm in size, and are usually black with white dots or lines on the thorax, elytra, and abdomen; each species has its own distinctive pattern. Oxythyrea are active during the day, and are often found on flowers, feeding.

Species

Oxythyrea abigail
Oxythyrea albopicta
Oxythyrea cinctella
Oxythyrea cinctelloides
Oxythyrea densata
Oxythyrea dulcis
Oxythyrea funesta
Oxythyrea groenbechi
Oxythyrea guttifera
Oxythyrea noemi
Oxythyrea pantherina
Oxythyrea producta
Oxythyrea subcalva
Oxythyrea tripolitana

Some of the species are often classified in a closely related genus Leucocelis.

Cetoniinae